Stanley James Snedden (23 September 1902 – 30 April 1980) was a New Zealand lawn bowls player.

Bowls career
Snedden represented New Zealand at the 1958 British Empire and Commonwealth Games in Cardiff, finishing 10th in the men's fours, alongside Robin Andrew, Jeff Barron, and Bill Hampton.

In 1938, Snedden won the fours title at the New Zealand National Bowls Championships, representing the Linwood club. Twenty-two years later, in 1960, he won the national singles title, also representing Linwood.

References

1902 births
1980 deaths
New Zealand male bowls players
Commonwealth Games competitors for New Zealand
Bowls players at the 1958 British Empire and Commonwealth Games
Sportspeople from Christchurch
Stanley
20th-century New Zealand people